The 1919–1920 season was the 45th season of competitive football in England, and the first following the end of World War I.

Honours

Notes = Number in parentheses is the times that club has won that honour. * indicates new record for competition

Football League

Following the War The Football League grew from 40 to 44 teams. The failure of Glossop to be re-elected to the league meant that five new clubs joined the league. A resurrected Stoke, along with Coventry City, South Shields, Rotherham County and West Ham United joined the Second Division.

Six of the seven players banned for their involvement in the 1915 British football betting scandal were re-instated in recognition of their service to the country during World War I.  Sandy Turnbull's re-instatement was posthumous as he had been killed in the war. Enoch West, who had fought his ban more vigorously than the others, was denied re-instatement.

First Division

Second Division

Southern League

Southern League First Division

References